The 2015 Korea National League, also known as Incheon International Airport National League 2015 due to the sponsorship of Incheon International Airport, was the 13th season of the Korea National League, the third tier of South Korea's football league system. Each of the ten clubs played three times against all other clubs in the regular season, and the top four clubs of the regular season qualified for post-season playoffs.

Teams

Regular season

League table

Positions by matchday

Results

Matches 1–18

Matches 19–27

Championship playoffs

Bracket

First round

Semi-final

Final

Hyundai Mipo Dockyard won 2–0 on aggregate.

See also
 2015 in South Korean football
 2015 Korea National League Championship
 2015 Korean FA Cup

References

External links
 Official website

Korea National League seasons
2015 in South Korean football
2015 domestic association football leagues